The 1895 Stanford football team represented Stanford University in the 1895 college football season and was coached by Walter Camp in his second consecutive and third overall year with the team. It was also his last year at Stanford; he returned to Yale after the season where he served as a volunteer advisory coach for 15 years.

Schedule

References

Stanford
Stanford Cardinal football seasons
Stanford football